Sea Life Safari is an underwater exploration video game originally developed by Wild Tangent for Microsoft Windows in 2007. Sierra Online released the game on Xbox Live Arcade on June 18, 2008.

Reception

The Xbox 360 version received "mixed" reviews according to the review aggregation website Metacritic. IGN reviewer Hilary Goldstein said of the same console version, "Sea Life Safari could have been a decent offering for children, but it falls short in far too many areas -- it's not educational, the photo analysis is inaccurate and it's not very fun." TeamXbox reviewer Andy Eddy was more kind, praising the presentation which "[is] a good feel for what it's like to be underwater—though not too photorealistic to make it dull and boring for the little ones."

References

External links
Sea Life Safari Game page

2007 video games
Casual games
Life simulation games
Sierra Entertainment games
Single-player video games
Video games developed in the United States
Video games scored by Adam Gubman
WildTangent games
Windows games
Xbox 360 Live Arcade games